Bodybuilding is the use of progressive resistance exercise to control and develop one's muscles (muscle building) by muscle hypertrophy for aesthetic purposes. It is distinct from similar activities such as powerlifting because it focuses on physical appearance instead of strength. An individual who engages in this activity is referred to as a bodybuilder.

In professional bodybuilding, competitors appear in lineups and perform specified poses (and later individual posing routines) for a panel of judges who rank them based on symmetry, muscularity, size, conditioning, posing, and stage presentation. Bodybuilders prepare for competitions through the elimination of nonessential body fat, enhanced at the last stage by a combination of extracellular dehydration and carbo-loading, to achieve maximum muscular definition and vascularity; they also tan and shave to accentuate the contrast of their skin under the spotlights.
Bodybuilding takes a great amount of effort and time to reach the desired results. A bodybuilder might first be able to gain  of muscle per year, if lifting for seven hours on a weekly basis. After five years, gains can decrease to just .

Some bodybuilders use anabolic steroids and other performance-enhancing drugs to build muscles and recover from injuries more quickly, but competitions sometimes ban using them because of the health risks or considerations regarding fair competition. Despite some calls for testing for steroids, the leading bodybuilding federation (National Physique Committee) does not require testing.

The winner of the annual IFBB Mr. Olympia contest is generally recognized as the world's top male professional bodybuilder. Since 1950, the NABBA Universe Championships have been considered the top amateur bodybuilding contests, with notable winners including Reg Park, Lee Priest, Steve Reeves, and Arnold Schwarzenegger.

History

Early history 

Stone-lifting traditions were practiced in ancient Egypt, Greece, and Tamilakam. Western weightlifting developed in Europe from 1880 to 1953, with strongmen displaying feats of strength for the public and challenging each other. The focus was not on their physique, and they possessed relatively large bellies and fatty limbs compared to bodybuilders of today.

Eugen Sandow 

Bodybuilding developed in the late 19th century, promoted in England by German Eugen Sandow, now considered as the "Father of Modern Bodybuilding". He allowed audiences to enjoy viewing his physique in "muscle display performances". Although audiences were thrilled to see a well-developed physique, the men simply displayed their bodies as part of strength demonstrations or wrestling matches. Sandow had a stage show built around these displays through his manager, Florenz Ziegfeld. The Oscar-winning 1936 musical film The Great Ziegfeld depicts the beginning of modern bodybuilding, when Sandow began to display his body for carnivals.

Sandow was so successful at flexing and posing his physique that he later created several businesses around his fame, and was among the first to market products branded with his name. He was credited with inventing and selling the first exercise equipment for the masses: machined dumbbells, spring pulleys, and tension bands. Even his image was sold by the thousands in "cabinet cards" and other prints.

First large-scale bodybuilding competition
Sandow organized the first bodybuilding contest on September 14, 1901, called the "Great Competition". It was held at the Royal Albert Hall in London. Judged by Sandow, Sir Charles Lawes, and Sir Arthur Conan Doyle, the contest was a great success and many bodybuilding enthusiasts were turned away due to the overwhelming number of audience members. The trophy presented to the winner was a gold statue of Sandow sculpted by Frederick Pomeroy. The winner was William L. Murray of Nottingham. The silver Sandow trophy was presented to second-place winner D. Cooper. The bronze Sandow trophy now the most famous of all was presented to third-place winner A.C. Smythe. In 1950, this same bronze trophy was presented to Steve Reeves for winning the inaugural NABBA Mr. Universe contest. It would not resurface again until 1977 when the winner of the IFBB Mr. Olympia contest, Frank Zane, was presented with a replica of the bronze trophy. Since then, Mr. Olympia winners have been consistently awarded a replica of the bronze Sandow.

From December 28, 1903 to January 2, 1904, the first large-scale bodybuilding competition in America took place at Madison Square Garden in New York City. The competition was promoted by Bernarr Macfadden, the father of physical culture and publisher of original bodybuilding magazines such as Health & Strength. The winner was Al Treloar, who was declared "The Most Perfectly Developed Man in the World". Treloar won a $1,000 cash prize, a substantial sum at that time. Two weeks later, Thomas Edison made a film of Treloar's posing routine. Edison had also made two films of Sandow a few years before. Those were the first three motion pictures featuring a bodybuilder. In the early 20th century, Macfadden and Charles Atlas continued to promote bodybuilding across the world.

Notable early bodybuilders 
Many other important bodybuilders in the early history of bodybuilding prior to 1930 include: Earle Liederman (writer of some of bodybuilding's earliest books), Zishe Breitbart, Georg Hackenschmidt, Emy Nkemena, George F. Jowett, Finn Hateral (a pioneer in the art of posing), Frank Saldo, Monte Saldo, William Bankier, Launceston Elliot, Sig Klein, Sgt. Alfred Moss, Joe Nordquist, Lionel Strongfort ("Strongfortism"), Gustav Frištenský, Ralph Parcaut (a champion wrestler who also authored an early book on "physical culture"), and Alan P. Mead (who became an impressive muscle champion despite the fact that he lost a leg in World War I). Actor Francis X. Bushman, who was a disciple of Sandow, started his career as a bodybuilder and sculptor's model before beginning his famous silent movie career.

1950s1960s 
Bodybuilding became more popular in the 1950s and 1960s with the emergence of strength and gymnastics champions, and the simultaneous popularization of bodybuilding magazines, training principles, nutrition for bulking up and cutting down, the use of protein and other food supplements, and the opportunity to enter physique contests. The number of bodybuilding organizations grew, and most notably the International Federation of Bodybuilders (IFBB) was founded in 1946 by Canadian brothers Joe and Ben Weider. Other bodybuilding organizations included the Amateur Athletic Union (AAU), National Amateur Bodybuilding Association (NABBA), and the World Bodybuilding Guild (WBBG). Consequently, the contests grew both in number and in size. Besides the many "Mr. XXX" (insert town, city, state, or region) championships, the most prestigious titles were Mr. America, Mr. World, Mr. Universe, Mr. Galaxy, and ultimately Mr. Olympia, which was started in 1965 by the IFBB and is now considered the most important bodybuilding competition in the world.

During the 1950s, the most successful and most famous competing bodybuilders were Bill Pearl, Reg Park, Leroy Colbert, and Clarence Ross. Certain bodybuilders rose to fame thanks to the relatively new medium of television, as well as cinema. The most notable were Jack LaLanne, Steve Reeves, Reg Park, and Mickey Hargitay. While there were well-known gyms throughout the country during the 1950s (such as Vince's Gym in North Hollywood, California and Vic Tanny's chain gyms), there were still segments of the United States that had no "hardcore" bodybuilding gyms until the advent of Gold's Gym in the mid-1960s.  Finally, the famed Muscle Beach in Santa Monica continued its popularity as the place to be for witnessing acrobatic acts, feats of strength, and the like. The movement grew more in the 1960s with increased TV and movie exposure, as bodybuilders were typecast in popular shows and movies.

1970s1990s

New organizations 

In the 1970s, bodybuilding had major publicity thanks to the appearance of Arnold Schwarzenegger, Franco Columbu, Lou Ferrigno, Mike Mentzer and others in the 1977 docudrama Pumping Iron. By this time, the IFBB dominated the competitive bodybuilding landscape and the Amateur Athletic Union (AAU) took a back seat. The National Physique Committee (NPC) was formed in 1981 by Jim Manion, who had just stepped down as chairman of the AAU Physique Committee. The NPC has gone on to become the most successful bodybuilding organization in the United States and is the amateur division of the IFBB. The late 1980s and early 1990s saw the decline of AAU-sponsored bodybuilding contests. In 1999, the AAU voted to discontinue its bodybuilding events.

Anabolic/androgenic steroid use 
This period also saw the rise of anabolic steroids in bodybuilding and many other sports. More significant use began with Arnold Schwarzenegger, Sergio Oliva, and Lou Ferrigno in the late 1960s and early 1970s, and continuing through the 1980s with Lee Haney, the 1990s with Dorian Yates, Ronnie Coleman, and Markus Rühl, and up to the present day. Bodybuilders such as Greg Kovacs attained mass and size never seen previously but were not successful at the pro level. Others were renowned for their spectacular development of a particular body part, like Tom Platz or Paul Demayo for their leg muscles. At the time of shooting Pumping Iron, Schwarzenegger, while never admitting to steroid use until long after his retirement, said, "You have to do anything you can to get the advantage in competition". He would later say that he did not regret using steroids.

To combat anabolic steroid use and in the hopes of becoming a member of the IOC, the IFBB introduced doping tests for both steroids and other banned substances. Although doping tests occurred, the majority of professional bodybuilders still used anabolic steroids for competition. During the 1970s, the use of anabolic steroids was openly discussed, partly due to the fact they were legal. In the Anabolic Steroid Control Act of 1990, U.S. Congress placed anabolic steroids into Schedule III of the Controlled Substances Act (CSA). In Canada, steroids are listed under Schedule IV of the Controlled Drugs and Substances Act, enacted by the federal Parliament in 1996.

World Bodybuilding Federation 

In 1990, professional wrestling promoter Vince McMahon attempted to form his own bodybuilding organization known as the World Bodybuilding Federation (WBF). It operated as a sister to the World Wrestling Federation (WWF, now WWE), which provided cross-promotion via its performers and personalities. Tom Platz served as the WBF's director of talent development, and announced the new organization during an ambush of that year's Mr. Olympia (which, unbeknownst to organizers, McMahon and Platz had attended as representatives of an accompanying magazine, Bodybuilding Lifestyles). It touted efforts to bring bigger prize money and more "dramatic" events to the sport of bodybuilding—which resulted in its championships being held as pay-per-view events with WWF-inspired sports entertainment features and showmanship. The organization signed high-valued contracts with a number of IFBB regulars.

The IFBB's inaugural championship in June 1991 (won by Gary Strydom) received mixed reviews. The WBF would be indirectly impacted by a steroid scandal involving the WWF, prompting the organization to impose a drug testing policy prior to the 1992 championship. The drug testing policy hampered the quality of the 1992 championship, while attempts to increase interest by hiring WCW wrestler Lex Luger as a figurehead (hosting a WBF television program on USA Network, and planning to make a guest pose during the 1992 championship before being injured in a motorcycle accident) and attempting to sign Lou Ferrigno (who left the organization shortly after the drug testing policy was announced) did not come to fruition. The second PPV received a minuscule audience, and the WBF dissolved only one month later in July 1992.

2000s

In 2003, Joe Weider sold Weider Publications to American Media, Inc. (AMI). The position of president of the IFBB was filled by Rafael Santonja following the death of Ben Weider in October 2008. In 2004, contest promoter Wayne DeMilia broke ranks with the IFBB and AMI took over the promotion of the Mr. Olympia contest: in 2017 AMI took the contest outright.

In the early 21st century, patterns of consumption and recreation similar to those of the United States became more widespread in Europe and especially in Eastern Europe following the collapse of the Soviet Union. This resulted in the emergence of whole new populations of bodybuilders from former Eastern Bloc states.

Olympic sport discussion 
In the early 2000s, the IFBB was attempting to make bodybuilding an Olympic sport. It obtained full IOC membership in 2000 and was attempting to get approved as a demonstration event at the Olympics, which would hopefully lead to it being added as a full contest. This did not happen and Olympic recognition for bodybuilding remains controversial since many argue that bodybuilding is not a sport.

Areas

Professional bodybuilding 

In the modern bodybuilding industry, the term "professional" generally means a bodybuilder who has won qualifying competitions as an amateur and has earned a "pro card" from their respective organization. Professionals earn the right to compete in competitions that include monetary prizes. A pro card also prohibits the athlete from competing in federations other than the one from which they have received the pro card. Depending on the level of success, these bodybuilders may receive monetary compensation from sponsors, much like athletes in other sports.

Natural bodybuilding 

Due to the growing concerns of the high cost, health consequences, and illegal nature of some steroids, many organizations have formed in response and have deemed themselves "natural" bodybuilding competitions. In addition to the concerns noted, many promoters of bodybuilding have sought to shed the "freakish" perception that the general public has of bodybuilding and have successfully introduced a more mainstream audience to the sport of bodybuilding by including competitors whose physiques appear much more attainable and realistic.

In natural contests, the testing protocol ranges among organizations from lie detectors to urinalysis. Penalties also range from organization to organization from suspensions to strict bans from competition. It is also important to note that natural organizations also have their own list of banned substances and it is important to refer to each organization's website for more information about which substances are banned from competition. There are many natural bodybuilding organizations; some of the larger ones include: MuscleMania, Ultimate Fitness Events (UFE), INBF/WNBF, and INBA/PNBA. These organizations either have an American or worldwide presence and are not limited to the country in which they are headquartered.

Men's physique 
Due to those who found open-bodybuilding to be "too big" or "ugly" and unhealthy, a new category was started in 2013. The first Men's Physique Olympia winner was Mark Wingson, who was followed by Jeremy Buendia for four consecutive years. Like open-bodybuilding, the federations in which bodybuilders can compete are natural divisions as well as normal ones. The main difference between the two is that men's physique competitors pose in board shorts rather than a traditional posing suit and open-bodybuilders are much larger and are more muscular than the men's physique competitors. Open-bodybuilders have an extensive routine for posing while the Physique category is primarily judged by the front and back poses. Many of the men's physique competitors are not above 200 lbs and have a bit of a more attainable and aesthetic physique in comparison to open-bodybuilders. Although this category started off slowly, it has grown tremendously, and currently men's physique seems to be a more popular class than open-bodybuilding.

Classic physique 
This is the middle ground of both Men's Physique and Bodybuilding. The competitors in this category are not nearly as big as bodybuilders but not as small as men's physique competitors. They pose and perform in men's boxer briefs to show off the legs, unlike Men's Physique which hide the legs in board shorts. Classic physique started in 2016. Danny Hester was the first classic physique Mr. Olympia and as of 2022, Chris Bumstead is the 4x reigning Mr. Olympia.

Female bodybuilding 
The female movement of the 1960s, combined with Title IX and the all around fitness revolution, gave birth to new alternative perspectives of feminine beauty that included an athletic physique of toned muscle. This athletic physique was found in various popular media outlets such as fashion magazines. Female bodybuilders changed the limits of traditional femininity as their bodies showed that muscles are not only just for men.

The first U.S. Women's National Physique Championship, promoted by Henry McGhee and held in 1978 in Canton, Ohio, is generally regarded as the first true female bodybuilding contest—that is, the first contest where the entrants were judged solely on muscularity. In 1980, the first Ms. Olympia (initially known as the "Miss" Olympia), the most prestigious contest for professionals, was held. The first winner was Rachel McLish, who had also won the NPC's USA Championship earlier in the year. The contest was a major turning point for female bodybuilding. McLish inspired many future competitors to start training and competing.

In 1985, the documentary Pumping Iron II: The Women was released. It documented the preparation of several women for the 1983 Caesars Palace World Cup Championship. Competitors prominently featured in the film were Kris Alexander, Lori Bowen, Lydia Cheng, Carla Dunlap, Bev Francis, and McLish. At the time, Francis was actually a powerlifter, though she soon made a successful transition to bodybuilding, becoming one of the leading competitors of the late 1980s and early 1990s.

The related areas of fitness and figure competition increased in popularity, surpassing that of female bodybuilding, and provided an alternative for women who choose not to develop the level of muscularity necessary for bodybuilding. McLish would closely resemble what is thought of today as a fitness and figure competitor, instead of what is now considered a female bodybuilder. Fitness competitions also adopted gymnastic elements.

E. Wilma Conner competed in the 2011 NPC Armbrust Pro Gym Warrior Classic Championships in Loveland, Colorado, at the age of 75 years and 349 days.

Competition 
In competitive bodybuilding, bodybuilders aspire to present an aesthetically pleasing body on stage. In prejudging, competitors do a series of mandatory poses: the front lat spread, rear lat spread, front double biceps, back double biceps, side chest, side triceps, Most Muscular (men only), abdominals and thighs. Each competitor also performs a personal choreographed routine to display their physique. A posedown is usually held at the end of a posing round, while judges are finishing their scoring. Bodybuilders usually spend a lot of time practising their posing in front of mirrors or under the guidance of their coach.

In contrast to strongman or powerlifting competitions, where physical strength is paramount, or to Olympic weightlifting, where the main point is equally split between strength and technique, bodybuilding competitions typically emphasize condition, size, and symmetry. Different organizations emphasize particular aspects of competition, and sometimes have different categories in which to compete.

Preparations

Bulking and cutting 

The general strategy adopted by most present-day competitive bodybuilders is to make muscle gains for most of the year (known as the "off-season") and, approximately 12–14 weeks from competition, lose a maximum of body fat (referred to as "cutting") while preserving as much muscular mass as possible. The bulking phase entails remaining in a net positive energy balance (calorie surplus). The amount of a surplus in which a person remains is based on the person's goals, as a bigger surplus and longer bulking phase will create more fat tissue. The surplus of calories relative to one's energy balance will ensure that muscles remain in a state of anabolism.

The cutting phase entails remaining in a net negative energy balance (calorie deficit). The main goal of cutting is to oxidize fat while preserving as much muscle as possible. The larger the calorie deficit, the faster one will lose weight. However, a large calorie deficit will also create the risk of losing muscle tissue.

The bulking and cutting strategy is effective because there is a well-established link between muscle hypertrophy and being in a state of positive energy balance. A sustained period of caloric surplus will allow the athlete to gain more fat-free mass than they could otherwise gain under eucaloric conditions. Some gain in fat mass is expected, which athletes seek to oxidize in a cutting period while maintaining as much lean mass as possible.

Clean bulking 
The attempt to increase muscle mass in one's body without any gain in fat is called clean bulking. Competitive bodybuilders focus their efforts to achieve a peak appearance during a brief "competition season". Clean bulking takes longer and is a more refined approach to achieving the body fat and muscle mass percentage a person is looking for. A common tactic for keeping fat low and muscle mass high is to have higher calorie and lower calorie days to maintain a balance between gain and loss. Many clean bulk diets start off with a moderate amount of carbs, moderate amount of protein, and a low amount of fats. To maintain a clean bulk, it is important to reach calorie goals every day. Macronutrient goals (carbs, fats, and proteins) will be different for each person, but it is ideal to get as close as possible.

Dirty bulking
"Dirty bulking" is the process of eating at a massive caloric surplus without trying to figure out the exact amount of ingested macronutrients. Weightlifters who attempt to gain mass quickly with no aesthetic concerns often choose to use the this method.

Muscle growth 
Bodybuilders use three main strategies to maximize muscle hypertrophy:
 Strength training through weights or elastic/hydraulic resistance.
 Specialized nutrition, incorporating extra protein and supplements when necessary.
 Adequate rest, including sleep and recuperation between workouts.

Weight training 

Intensive weight training causes micro-tears to the muscles being trained; this is generally known as microtrauma. These micro-tears in the muscle contribute to the soreness felt after exercise, called delayed onset muscle soreness (DOMS). It is the repair of these micro-traumas that results in muscle growth. Normally, this soreness becomes most apparent a day or two after a workout. However, as muscles become adapted to the exercises, soreness tends to decrease.

Weight training aims to build muscle by prompting two different types of hypertrophy: sarcoplasmic and myofibrillar. Sarcoplasmic hypertrophy leads to larger muscles and so is favored by bodybuilders more than myofibrillar hypertrophy, which builds athletic strength. Sarcoplasmic hypertrophy is triggered by increasing repetitions, whereas myofibrillar hypertrophy is triggered by lifting heavier weight. In either case, there is an increase in both size and strength of the muscles (compared to what happens if that same individual does not lift weights at all), however, the emphasis is different.

Nutrition 
The high levels of muscle growth and repair achieved by bodybuilders require a specialized diet. Generally speaking, bodybuilders require more calories than the average person of the same weight to provide the protein and energy requirements needed to support their training and increase muscle mass. In preparation of a contest, a sub-maintenance level of food energy is combined with cardiovascular exercise to lose body fat. Proteins, carbohydrates and fats are the three major macronutrients that the human body needs in order to build muscle. The ratios of calories from carbohydrates, proteins, and fats vary depending on the goals of the bodybuilder.

Carbohydrates 
Carbohydrates play an important role for bodybuilders. They give the body energy to deal with the rigors of training and recovery. Carbohydrates also promote secretion of insulin, a hormone enabling cells to get the glucose they need. Insulin also carries amino acids into cells and promotes protein synthesis. Insulin has steroid-like effects in terms of muscle gains. It is impossible to promote protein synthesis without the existence of insulin, which means that without ingesting carbohydrates or protein—which also induces the release of insulin—it is impossible to add muscle mass. Bodybuilders seek out low-glycemic polysaccharides and other slowly digesting carbohydrates, which release energy in a more stable fashion than high-glycemic sugars and starches. This is important as high-glycemic carbohydrates cause a sharp insulin response, which places the body in a state where it is likely to store additional food energy as fat. However, bodybuilders frequently do ingest some quickly digesting sugars (often in form of pure dextrose or maltodextrin) just before, during, and/or just after a workout. This may help to replenish glycogen stored within the muscle, and to stimulate muscle protein synthesis.

Protein 

The motor proteins actin and myosin generate the forces exerted by contracting muscles. Cortisol decreases amino acid uptake by muscle and inhibits protein synthesis. Current recommendations suggest that bodybuilders should consume 25–30% of protein per total calorie intake to further their goal of maintaining and improving their body composition. This is a widely debated topic, with many arguing that 1 gram of protein per pound of body weight per day is ideal, some suggesting that less is sufficient, while others recommending 1.5, 2, or more. It is believed that protein needs to be consumed frequently throughout the day, especially during/after a workout, and before sleep. There is also some debate concerning the best type of protein to take. Chicken, turkey, beef, pork, fish, eggs and dairy foods are high in protein, as are some nuts, seeds, beans, and lentils. Casein or whey are often used to supplement the diet with additional protein. Whey is the type of protein contained in many popular brands of protein supplements and is preferred by many bodybuilders because of its high biological value (BV) and quick absorption rates. Whey protein also has a bigger effect than casein on insulin levels, triggering about double the amount of insulin release. That effect is somewhat overcome by combining casein and whey.

Bodybuilders were previously thought to require protein with a higher BV than that of soy, which was additionally avoided due to its alleged estrogenic (female hormone) properties, though more recent studies have shown that soy actually contains phytoestrogens which compete with estrogens in the male body and can block estrogenic actions. Soy, flax, and other plant-based foods that contain phytoestrogens are also beneficial because they can inhibit some pituitary functions while stimulating the liver's P450 system (which eliminates hormones, drugs, and waste from the body) to more actively process and excrete excess estrogen.

Meals 
Some bodybuilders often split their food intake into 5 to 7 meals of equal nutritional content and eat at regular intervals (e.g., every 2 to 3 hours). This approach serves two purposes: to limit overindulging in the cutting phase, and to allow for the consumption of large volumes of food during the bulking phase. Eating more frequently does not increase basal metabolic rate when compared to 3 meals a day. While food does have a metabolic cost to digest, absorb, and store, called the thermic effect of food, it depends on the quantity and type of food, not how the food is spread across the meals of the day. Well-controlled studies using whole-body calorimetry and doubly labeled water have demonstrated that there is no metabolic advantage to eating more frequently.

Dietary supplements 

The important role of nutrition in building muscle and losing fat means bodybuilders may consume a wide variety of dietary supplements. Various products are used in an attempt to augment muscle size, increase the rate of fat loss, improve joint health, increase natural testosterone production, enhance training performance and prevent potential nutrient deficiencies.

Performance-enhancing substances 
Some bodybuilders use drugs such as anabolic steroids and precursor substances such as prohormones to increase muscle hypertrophy. Anabolic steroids cause hypertrophy of both types (I and II) of muscle fibers, likely caused by an increased synthesis of muscle proteins. They also provoke undesired side effects including hepatotoxicity, gynecomastia, acne, the early onset of male pattern baldness and a decline in the body's own testosterone production, which can cause testicular atrophy. Other performance-enhancing substances used by competitive bodybuilders include human growth hormone (HGH). HGH is also used by female bodybuilders to obtain bigger muscles "while maintaining a 'female appearance'".

Muscle growth is more difficult to achieve in older adults than younger adults because of biological aging, which leads to many metabolic changes detrimental to muscle growth; for instance, by diminishing growth hormone and testosterone levels. Some recent clinical studies have shown that low-dose HGH treatment for adults with HGH deficiency changes the body composition by increasing muscle mass, decreasing fat mass, increasing bone density and muscle strength, improves cardiovascular parameters, and affects the quality of life without significant side effects.

In rodents, knockdown of metallothionein gene expression results in activation of the Akt pathway and increases in myotube size, in type IIb fiber hypertrophy, and ultimately in muscle strength.

Injecting oil into muscles  

A recent trend in bodybuilding is to inject synthol into muscles to create larger bulges, or injecting PMMA into muscles to shape them. Use of PMMA to shape muscles is prohibited in the United States. However, it is not illegal to use synthol.

Site enhancement oil, often called santol or synthol (no relation to the Synthol mouthwash brand), refers to oils injected into muscles to increase the size or change the shape. Some bodybuilders, particularly at the professional level, inject their muscles with such mixtures to mimic the appearance of developed muscle where it may otherwise be disproportionate or lacking. This is known as "fluffing". Synthol is 85% oil, 7.5% lidocaine, and 7.5% alcohol. It is not restricted, and many brands are available on the Internet. The use of injected oil to enhance muscle appearance is common among bodybuilders, despite the fact that synthol can cause pulmonary embolisms, nerve damage, infections, sclerosing lipogranuloma, stroke, and the formation of oil-filled granulomas, cysts or ulcers in the muscle. Rare cases might require surgical intervention to avoid further damage to the muscle and/or to prevent loss of life.

Sesame oil is often used in such mixtures, which can cause allergic reactions such as vasculitis.

As the injected muscle is not actually well-developed, it might droop under gravity.

Rest 
Although muscle stimulation occurs when lifting weights, muscle growth occurs afterward during rest periods. Without adequate rest (48 to 72 hours) and sleep (6 to 8 hours a night), muscles do not have an opportunity to recover and grow. Additionally, many athletes find that a daytime nap further increases their body's ability to recover from training and build muscles. Some bodybuilders add a massage at the end of each workout to their routine as a method of recovering.

Overtraining 

Overtraining occurs when a bodybuilder has trained to the point where their workload exceeds their recovery capacity. There are many reasons why overtraining occurs, including lack of adequate nutrition, lack of recovery time between workouts, insufficient sleep, and training at a high intensity for too long (a lack of splitting apart workouts). Training at a high intensity too frequently also stimulates the central nervous system (CNS) and can result in a hyperadrenergic state that interferes with sleep patterns. To avoid overtraining, intense frequent training must be met with at least an equal amount of purposeful recovery. Timely provision of carbohydrates, proteins, and various micronutrients such as vitamins, minerals, phytochemicals, even nutritional supplements are critical. A mental disorder, informally called bigorexia (by analogy with anorexia), may account for overtraining in some individuals. Sufferers feel as if they are never big enough or muscular enough, which forces them to overtrain in order to try to reach their goal physique.

An article by Muscle & Fitness magazine, "Overtrain for Big Gains", claimed that overtraining for a brief period can be beneficial. Overtraining can be used advantageously, as when a bodybuilder is purposely overtrained for a brief period of time to super compensate during a regeneration phase. These are known as "shock micro-cycles" and were a key training technique used by Soviet athletes.

See also

References

External links 

 
Body modification
Athletic sports
Individual sports
Weight training
Body shape
Articles containing video clips
Physical exercise